Wadud may refer to:

 Abdul Wadud, several people
 Al Wadud, Bangladeshi cricketer
 Amina Wadud (born 1952), American Islamic feminist
 Wadud Ahmad, American poet
 Al-Wadūd (Arabic: الودود), one of the names of God in Islam

Arabic masculine given names
Names of God in Islam